Events in the year 1978 in Spain.

Incumbents
 Monarch – Juan Carlos I
 Prime Minister of Spain – Adolfo Suárez

Events
 28 February – CEIM organization is formed in Madrid.
 11 July – Los Alfaques disaster: a truck carrying highly flammable propylene explodes near Los Alfaques seaside campsite killing at least 217 people.
 22 October – An attack in Getxo by the separatist group ETA kills three people.
 6 December – Spanish Constitution of 1978 ratified in a referendum.
 1978 Spanish trade union representative elections

Births
 1 July – Alessandra Aguilar, athlete
 5 November - Xavier Tondó, cyclist (died 2011)

Deaths
 7 September – Ricardo Zamora, footballer (born 1901)

References

1978 in Spain
Spain
Years of the 20th century in Spain